Grosvenor is an unincorporated community in Brown County, Texas, United States. According to the Handbook of Texas, the community had no population estimates in 2000. It is located within the Brownwood, Texas micropolitan area.

History
Grosvenor was named for Ohio U.S. Representative Charles H. Grosvenor. A post office was established at Grosvenor in 1900 and remained in operation until the mid-1970s. In 1914, the community had three stores and 50 inhabitants. It had between one to two businesses and 42 residents in 1940. The population further declined to 31 in 1980 and had no population recorded in 2000, despite being listed on county maps.

Geography

Education
In 1940, Grosvenor had its own elementary school. Today, the community is served by the Bangs Independent School District.

References

Unincorporated communities in Brown County, Texas
Unincorporated communities in Texas